The Colombian football league system is a series of interconnected football leagues for clubs in Colombia, and is governed by the Colombian Football Federation at the national level. From 1991 to 2010 there was a Categoría Primera C for amateur and reserve teams.

Structure
The Colombian league system consists of two categories. At the top of the pyramid is Categoría Primera A or Primera A, which consists of the top 20 teams of the country. Below them is Categoría Primera B or Primera B. Teams in Primera A play independent of the 16 teams that make up Primera B.

Current system

Men's

Women's

Football leagues in Colombia
Football league systems in South America